The Philippines women's national basketball team is managed by the Samahang Basketbol ng Pilipinas (SBP).

Compared to the men's national team, the women's national team receives less reception from local basketball enthusiasts. Locally based players has no national league to play in after college which has a few leagues such as the WNCAA, Filoil Premier Cup, and Fr. Martin's Cup. The women's national team has been playing at Level II at the FIBA Asia Championship for Women for the past few editions of the tournament. Again in contrast of their men counterpart who were often describe as powerhouses in the Southeast Asia region, the women's national team has been behind Thailand and Malaysia in the past few years.

History

Early history

Women's basketball in the Philippines dates back as early as the 1910s. Basketball was first introduced to the Philippine public school system by the Americans as a women's sort in 1910 and was played in Interscholastic meets in 1911 until 1913. The sport used by Americans to promote good health and motherhood and citizenry grew in popularity among women. Women's basketball met opposition from conservative groups, particularly the Catholic Church who view bloomers worn by women basketball players as inappropriate. By the time skirts were allowed to be worn above bloomers as a compromise, women's basketball is already in the decline and is only played in provincial and local interscholastic meets. Indoor softball and as well as volleyball became the more preferred sport for Filipino women.

SBP era (2007–present)

Perlas Pilipinas 1.0 (2007–2015)
On 2007, Discovery Suites, a hotel brand, became the main sponsor of the women's national team. On 2008, Haydee Ong was appointed as head coach of the women's national team replacing Matthew "Fritz" Gaston, who guided the team to a bronze medal finish at the 2007 Southeast Asian Games in Thailand and a silver medal finish at the 2007 SEABA Championship for Women. Under Ong, the team won the gold medal at the 2010 SEABA Championship for Women, the country's first medal at the said tournament. The team previously won silver during the 1995, 1997, and 2007 editions of the tournament.

The team pushed for the naturalization of 6'3" tall Chinese, Zheng Xiaojing, a move parallel to the naturalization of American-born Marcus Douthit for the men's national team. Zheng's naturalization process started with the filing of House Bill 02683 by Congressman Roberto Puno of Antipolo in August, about the same time as Douthit's. Head coach Ong lobbied the SBP and the Philippine Congress to hasten the naturalization process of Zheng so that she can join the national team for the 2011 editions of the FIBA Asia Championship and the Southeast Asian Games While Douthit was eventually naturalized, Zheng's naturalization was in limbo. In August 2014, team manager, Cynthia Tiu said that the team will focus on developing homegrown players than resort to naturalizing players. Tiu said that Zheng was disappointed but also said that a re-filing of her petition for naturalization cannot be done since Zheng is already married.

Perlas Pilipinas 2.0 (2015–2019)
The SBP appointed Patrick Aquino as the new head coach of the national team. His first task will be to guide the national team at the 2015 Southeast Asian Games. Ever Bilena Cosmetics, Inc. has been made the new sponsor of the national team. SBP executive director Sonny Barrios pointed out the decision to make changes in the coaching staff of the women's team was made after discussions among members of the search and screening committee, which is composed of several basketball stakeholders.

In a historic run, Perlas officially promoted in the Level 1 of the FIBA Asia Women's Championships that will held in 2017, after the win against India, 82–76.

Gilas Pilipinas Women (2019–present)
In May 2019, the SBP announced that the Gilas Pilipinas name would be used across all its sporting programs for the men's, men's youth (men's under-19 and men's under-17), men's 3x3 and women's teams. Aquino assumed responsibility over the Gilas Pilipinas Women program.

Fixtures and results

Medal count

Competitions

FIBA Women's Basketball World Cup

Olympic Games

FIBA World Olympic Qualifying Tournament

FIBA Women's Asia Cup

Asian Games

SEABA Championship for Women

Southeast Asian Games

Other tournaments

Team

Current roster
Philippines roster at the 2021 FIBA Women's Asia Cup.

Past rosters
Note: Olympics, World Championships, Asian Games, Asian Championships only.

Coaches
 Ricardo Roces (c. 1997)
 Matthew "Fritz" Gatson (2007)
 Haydee Ong (2008–2014)
 Patrick Aquino (2015–present)

References

External links

FIBA Profile

 
 
Women's basketball in the Philippines
Women's national basketball teams
1936 establishments in the Philippines